Paadu Nilave is a 1987 Indian Tamil-language romantic musical film, directed by K. Rangaraj and written by M. G. Vallaban from a story by R. Selvaraj. The film stars Mohan and Nadhiya, with Ravichandran, Senthil, Vennira Aadai Moorthy, J. V. Somayajulu, A. R. Srinivasan and Typist Gopu in supporting roles. It was released on 15 May 1987 and became a commercial success.

Plot 
Balakrishnan "Balu" is a die hard fan of singer Sangeetha. By chance Sangeetha visits Balakrishnan's village for a vacation. When he tries to meet her, he is continuously ragged and insulted by her and her assistants. One day when Sangeetha hears him sing near a beach, she realises his talent and also learns about his struggles. They become good friends and Sangeetha wishes to stay in the village for longer. However her father comes and immediately takes her back to Chennai for her singing events and she leaves without informing Balakrishnan. Balakrishnan heartbroken goes to Chennai in search of her and finally when he reaches her home, he gets insulted. On that day he decides to take revenge on her by becoming a popular singer just like her. He is helped by a policeman who suggests that he learn singing from a man in jail. So Balu goes to the jail where he finds the man to be his father. But he does not reveal the truth in fear of being unable to learn from his father.

After learning proper music he becomes a good singer. He meets Sangeetha while in jail where she comes to sing in a function. He sings in front of her and she becomes very happy while he remains angry. She later gives him the chance to begin his career as a singer at her own studio and he becomes famous. Now she meets singer Balu at his house but he insults her the same way she did at her house. She then tells all the truth that she insulted him to protect him from her money minded father. He then acts as if he believed her and embraces her while planning his revenge. They get married and the next day Balu leaves her at her home. When enquired about why he behaves so, he says he did it all to take revenge on her and her father. It is revealed that Sangeetha's father killed Balu's sister and his innocent father was framed for the same and sent to jail. Balu challenges Sangeetha for a music competition with the condition that the loser should never sing again. Her father decides to kill Balu on the day of the competition. All the efforts to prevent this go in vain and the competition begins. Both of them sing fabulously and in the end, Sangeetha gets injured while protecting Balu and her father is shot dead by the police. He gives a last statement that Balu's father is innocent and he is the killer. Balu's father is released from the jail. Balu and Sangeetha finally unite.

Cast 
 Mohan as Balakrishnan
 Baby Sujitha as Child Balakrishnan
 Nadhiya as Sangeetha
 Ravichandran as Ramanathan
 Senthil as Thiri Vetti
 Vennira Aadai Moorthy as Moorthi
 J. V. Somayajulu as Muthaiah Bhagavathar
 A. R. Srinivasan as Jailor
 Typist Gopu as Inspector
 Kalaranjini as Lalitha, Balakrishnan's sister (Guest appearance)

Production 
Paadu Nilave was directed by K. Rangaraj and produced by Ilango. The film's screenplay was written by M. G. Vallaban from a story by R. Selvaraj. Cinematography was handled by Dinesh Baboo and Srinivas Krishna.

Soundtrack 
The soundtrack was composed by Ilaiyaraaja and lyrics were written by Vaali. The song "Malaiyoram Veesum Kaathu" is set in the Carnatic raga known as Keeravani, and "Vaa Veliye" is set in Shubhapantuvarali.

Release and reception 
Paadu Nilave was released on 15 May 1987. The following week, The Indian Express wrote, "This thoroughly contrived storyline banks itself eagerly on the revenge element, and coming to think of it, its essential structure bears many similarities to last year's hit Amman Kovil Kizhakale." Jayamanmadhan of Kalki wrote that, despite dealing with an old wine of an ordinary fan transforming into an top singer, the way screenplay has been stitched by adding elements like accused father, deceased sister and the long lost son it makes the mix more better. He also praised Mohan-Nadia's pairing, ARS's performance and the cinematography but panned the climax, calling it absurd in an otherwise balanced plot. The film was commercially successful.

References

Bibliography

External links 
 

1980s romantic musical films
1980s Tamil-language films
1987 films
Films about singers
Films directed by K. Rangaraj
Films scored by Ilaiyaraaja
Films shot in Ooty
Indian romantic musical films